Panchadewal Binayak is a municipality located in Accham District of Sudurpashchim province of Nepal. It is surrounded by Kalikot District of Karnali Province in the East, Kamalbazar in the West, Ramaroshan in the North and Dailekh District in the South.

History
On 10 March 2017 Government of Nepal announced 744 local level units as per the new constitution of Nepal 2015. thus this local level unit came into existence. The municipality is divided into 9  wards. Kuika (half part), Binayak, Kalikasthan, Layati, Toli, Pulletala, Warla and Kalekanda villages were merged to form this new local level unit.

References

External links
http://mofald.gov.np/sites/default/files/News_Notices/Final%20District%201-75%20Corrected%20Last%20for%20RAJPATRA.pdf
https://web.archive.org/web/20180831065451/http://103.69.124.141/
http://kathmandupost.ekantipur.com/news/2017-08-11/govt-prepares-to-add-9-more-local-levels-in-province-2.html

Municipalities in Achham District
Nepal municipalities established in 2017